Bernard Bocquet (24 March 1949 – 19 April 2017) was a French cyclist. He competed in the team pursuit event at the 1972 Summer Olympics.

References

External links
 

1949 births
2017 deaths
French male cyclists
Olympic cyclists of France
Cyclists at the 1972 Summer Olympics
People from Meudon
French track cyclists
Sportspeople from Hauts-de-Seine
Cyclists from Île-de-France